The VON is an American band based in South Florida. The band comprises Luis Bonilla, Marek Schneider and Elisa Seda.

History
The VON was formed in 2013 by the vocalist and bassist Luis Bonilla and the guitarist Marek Schneider. The VON has seen the majority of its career as a trio with the drummer Elisa Seda. Elisa became the part of the band when she replaced their former drummer when the band's 2015 album was recorded.

In 2015, THE VON released its album Ei8ht. The album depicts musical influences how they came together with respect to their diverse cultures, yoga ideology, and the themes of fearlessly living the life. The VON released their first single, Nothing to Fear, in the start of 2015. This was followed by Cry Of War in 2016. The VON is now working on a National and European Tour.

Discography 
The following tracks were released by The VON:

Sacred Water, 2017 (Single)

3nity, 2016 (EP)

 I Know It's Love
 Nature of the Beast
My Heart Machine

ei8ht, 2015 (Album)
 Nothing to Fear
 The Machine
 Cry of War
 Love Supreme
 Atomic Sun
 Let It Out
 Don’t Forget About Us
 Ei8ht (Spirit & Matter)

Protagonist, 2013 (EP)

 My Fantasy
 The Machine
 Don't Forget About Us

References

Indie rock musical groups from Florida
American electro musicians
American musical trios
Musical groups established in 2013
2013 establishments in Florida